is a Japanese scholar of Islam. He is professor emeritus of Islamic studies at both Tokyo University and Oberlin University. Tokyo University's Department of Islamic Studies was the first such department in Japan, established in 1982 with Nakamura appointed as its first professor.

He translated and commented on portions of Al-Ghazali's Revival of Religious Sciences, his most important work, for the Islamic Texts Society in 1992. Much of Nakamura's effort has been spent on analysis of al-Ghazali's works, a number of which Nakamura has translated to the Japanese language. Nakamura's Islam and Modernity also focuses on what he holds are four main streams of modern Islamic thought in order to frame Islamic studies within the wider field of religious studies. He also served as a conference chair at the first al-Manar conference organised by Routledge.

He received his PhD from Harvard University in 1970.

Citations

External links
Bibliography at GoodReads

Islamic studies scholars
Japanese non-fiction writers
Japanese translators
Japanese writers
Living people
Harvard University alumni
1936 births